Nancy J. Cox (born 1949) is an American virologist who has served as the director of the Influenza Division at the Centers for Disease Control and Prevention (CDC) from 2006 to 2014 and as director of the CDC's World Health Organization (WHO) Collaborating Center for Surveillance, Epidemiology and Control of Influenza from 1992 to 2014. Cox served as the Chair and Co-Chair of the Scientific Advisory Council of the GISAID Initiative, between the years 2008 and 2017 and is frequently recognized for having played an instrumental role in the success of GISAID.

Biography 
Nancy J. Cox was born in 1949 and is a native of Curlew, Iowa. She was educated at Iowa State University, graduating in 1970 with a degree in Bacteriology. Dr. Cox was awarded a Marshall Scholarship to study in England at the University of Cambridge at Darwin College, Cambridge, where in 1975 she earned a doctoral degree in virology.

Dr. Cox started working on influenza at the CDC in 1976. She retired in December 2014, after 37 years and 278 publications. Over the course of her career, Cox helped transform the surveillance and science of influenza viruses and vaccines worldwide. At the CDC, she set the standards for measuring immune response in infected and vaccinated people, and also led the agency to be the global reference center for antiviral resistance and for measuring transmission of influenza viruses in animal models. As director of the World Health Organization (WHO) Collaborating Center for the Surveillance, Epidemiology and Control of Influenza at the CDC, Cox worked closely with public health officials from Russia, Vietnam and China, helping to transform their capabilities in influenza virology and surveillance. Her work with WHO also led to significant changes in the methods, reporting, interpretation, and policy development for selecting vaccine viruses for use in annual influenza vaccine production.

Cox has been the recipient of ten CDC recognition awards, seven Nakano Awards, four Shepard Awards, The Lancet’s “Paper of the Year,” Time Magazine’s “The Time 100: People Who Shape Our World,” the Service to America Award, CDC's Lifetime Achievement Award and the US Government Federal Employee of the Year award.

References

|-

|-

American virologists
1949 births
Living people
Iowa State University alumni
Alumni of Darwin College, Cambridge
Marshall Scholars